Island View is an unincorporated community in Koochiching County, Minnesota, United States.

The community is located ten miles east of International Falls at Rainy Lake on State Highway 11 (MN 11).

Island View is located within Rainy Lake Unorganized Territory.

The Rainy Lake Visitor Center at Voyageurs National Park is nearby.

Island View disincorporated in 1992.

References

 Rand McNally Road Atlas – 2007 edition – Minnesota entry
 Official State of Minnesota Highway Map – 2011/2012 edition
 Mn/DOT map of Koochiching County – Sheet 4 – 2011 edition

Former municipalities in Minnesota
Unincorporated communities in Minnesota
Unincorporated communities in Koochiching County, Minnesota
Populated places disestablished in 1992